The 2018–19 season was Empoli Football Club's 83rd in existence and 13th season in Serie A. It was the club's first season back in the top-flight after suffering relegation at the end of the 2016–17 season.

Players

Squad information

Appearances include league matches only

Transfers

In

Loans in

Out

Loans out

Competitions

Serie A

League table

Results summary

Results by round

Matches

Coppa Italia

Statistics

Appearances and goals

|-
! colspan=14 style=background:#DCDCDC; text-align:center"| Goalkeepers

|-
! colspan=14 style=background:#DCDCDC; text-align:center"| Defenders

|-
! colspan=14 style=background:#DCDCDC; text-align:center"| Midfielders

|-
! colspan=14 style=background:#DCDCDC; text-align:center"| Forwards

|-
! colspan=14 style=background:#DCDCDC; text-align:center"| Players transferred out during the season

Goalscorers

Last updated: 7 April 2019

Clean sheets

Last updated: 7 April 2019

Disciplinary record

Last updated: 7 April 2019

References

Empoli F.C. seasons
Empoli